The 2009–10 Plunket Shield season is the 84th season of official first-class domestic cricket in New Zealand. The season began on 10 November 2009.

Table

The Plunket Shield will be decided on points at the end of the 10 rounds.

Teams

Fixtures and results

Round 1

Round 2

Round 3

Round 4

Round 5

Round 6

Round 7

Round 8

Round 9

Round 10

Statistics

Most Runs

Most Wickets

See also

Plunket Shield
New Zealand limited-overs cricket trophy
State Twenty20
2009–10 New Zealand one-day cricket competition season

References

The History of the Sheffield Shield, Chris Harte
A Century of Summers: 100 years of Sheffield Shield cricket, Geoff Armstrong
blackcaps.co.nz > Archive  > Seasons

Domestic cricket competitions in 2009–10
Plunket Shield
1